The 1981 Seattle Seahawks season was the team's sixth season with the National Football League (NFL). The Seahawks got off to a terrible start, losing six of their first seven games, on the way to a 6–10 season. Steve Largent would have a stellar season with 1,224 receiving yards. Seattle opened their season at Cincinnati, and held a 21–0 lead before the Bengals rallied for an improbable 27–21 win. This loss proved to be the beginning of the end for the Seahawks in 1981, as they would struggle as the season progressed.

The last remaining active member of the 1981 Seattle Seahawks was quarterback Dave Krieg, who retired after the 1998 season.

Offseason

NFL Draft

Personnel

Staff

Final roster

     Starters in bold.
 (*) Denotes players that were selected for the 1982 Pro Bowl.

Schedule

Preseason

Source: Seahawks Media Guides

Regular season

Bold indicates division opponents.
Source: 1981 NFL season results

Standings

Game Summaries

Preseason

Week P1: vs. San Francisco 49ers

Week P2: vs. St. Louis Cardinals

Week P3: at San Francisco 49ers

Week P4: vs. Baltimore Colts

Regular season

Week 1: at Cincinnati Bengals

Week 2: vs. Denver Broncos

Week 3: at Oakland Raiders

Week 4: vs. Kansas City Chiefs

Week 5: at San Diego Chargers

Week 6: at Houston Oilers

Week 7: vs. New York Giants

Week 8: at New York Jets

Week 9: at Green Bay Packers

Week 10: vs. Pittsburgh Steelers

Week 11: vs. San Diego Chargers

Week 12: at Kansas City Chiefs

Week 13: vs. Oakland Raiders

Week 14: vs. New York Jets

Week 15: at Denver Broncos

Week 16: vs. Cleveland Browns

References

External links
 Seahawks draft history at NFL.com
 1981 NFL season results at NFL.com

Seattle
Seattle Seahawks seasons